Sandra Spuzich (April 3, 1937 – October 6, 2015) was an American professional golfer who played on the LPGA Tour in the 1960s, 1970s and 1980s.

Spuzich was born in Indianapolis, Indiana, of Polish, Serbian, Macedonian and Lebanese descent. She was an amateur golfer and elementary school teacher when she decided to turn professional in 1962. Her first win came at the 1966 U.S. Women's Open by one stroke over Carol Mann and two strokes over Mickey Wright. The tournament was held at Hazeltine National Golf Club in Chaska, Minnesota – the first major championship played there.

In 1982 at the age of 45, Spuzich became the oldest player to win two LPGA Tour events in the same year when she won the Corning Classic followed by the Mary Kay Classic.

Spuzich died in Indianapolis on October 6, 2015. Her life partner was fellow LPGA golfer Joyce Kazmierski.

Professional wins

LPGA Tour wins (7)

LPGA Tour playoff record (2–2)

Other wins (1)
1966 Haig & Haig Scotch Foursome (with Jack Rule, Jr.)

Major championships

Wins (1)

References

American female golfers
Indiana Hoosiers women's golfers
LPGA Tour golfers
Winners of LPGA major golf championships
Golfers from Indiana
American LGBT sportspeople
LGBT people from Indiana
LGBT golfers
Lesbian sportswomen
Sportspeople from Indianapolis
American people of Polish descent
American people of Serbian descent
American people of Macedonian descent
American people of Lebanese descent
Sportspeople of Lebanese descent
1937 births
2015 deaths